Frixa (before 1916: Ανεμοχωράκιον - Anemochorakion) is a village in the municipal unit of Skillounta, Elis, Greece. In 2011 its population was 200 for the village and 309 for the community, which includes the village Anemochoraki. Frixa is on a hill near the left bank of the river Alfeios, 2 km northeast of Skillountia, 7 km southeast of Olympia and 8 km northeast of Krestena.

Population

History
Phrixa was a hilltop town in the ancient land of Pisa. The town was already ruined in Pausanias' days (2nd century AD). It had a temple of Cydonian Athena. It was said that the temple was founded by Clymenus from Kydonia in Crete, a descendant of Heracles of Ida.

See also

List of settlements in Elis

References

External links
Frixa at the GTP Travel Pages

Cities in ancient Peloponnese
Skillounta
Populated places in Elis